VDU may stand for:
VDU, a self contained attitude control thruster block on space station Mir
Federation of Independents,  German nationalist political party in Austria active from 1949 to 1955
Vacuum distillation unit, a processing unit in an oil refinery
Video display unit, a synonym for a type of computer monitor
Visual display unit, an electronic visual display
Vytautas Magnus University in Kaunas, Lithuania

See also
Vudu